Pneumophionyssus aristoterisi is a species of mite placed in its own family, Pneumophionyssidae, in the order Mesostigmata.

References

Mesostigmata